Gatlin may refer to:

People

Surname
 Alfred Moore Gatlin (1790–1841), American Representative from North Carolina
Helen Camille Stanley Hartmeyer Gatlin (born 1930), composer and violist
 Justin Gatlin (born 1982), American sprinter
 LaDonna Gatlin (born 1954), American musician
 Larry Gatlin (born 1948), American country music singer
 Richard C. Gatlin (1809–1896), Confederate Army Brigadier General

Places
 Gatlin Site, archaeological site in Arizona
 Gatlin Glacier, Antarctica
 Gatlin Peak, Antarctica

See also
 Gatlin Brothers-Southwest Golf Classic, a former professional golf event in Abilene, Texas (played under this name from 1981 to 1988)
 The Champions Classic, formerly named Gatlin Brothers Seniors Golf Classic. A former professional golf event (1983 to 1985)
 Gatlin, Nebraska, a fictional town in the short story "Children of the Corn" by Stephen King
 Gatlin, South Carolina, a fictional town in the novel Beautiful Creatures by Kami Garcia and Margaret Stohl
 Gatling gun, early hand-cranked weapon